Poshtaveh-ye Sofla (also Romanized as Poshtāveh-ye Soflá; also known as Poshtāveh-ye Pā’īn) is a village in Bahmai-ye Garmsiri-ye Jonubi Rural District, in the Central District of Bahmai County, Kohgiluyeh and Boyer-Ahmad Province, Iran. At the 2006 census, its population was 21, in 5 families.

References 

Populated places in Bahmai County